Sunungura "Gogo" Rusununguko (born April 12, 1978) is a former American football player who played four seasons in the Arena Football League (AFL) with the Indiana Firebirds, Colorado Crush and New Orleans VooDoo. He played college football at Ball State University and attended Franklin Central High School in Indianapolis, Indiana. He was also a member of the Las Vegas Gladiators, New York Dragons and RiverCity Rage.

College career
Rusununguko  played for the Ball State Cardinals from 1996 to 2000. He was the co-winner, along with Adrian Reese, of the John Hodge Award for Ball State Outstanding Freshman in 1996 as a defensive tackle. He earned second team All-Mid-American Conference honors and was a team captain for the Cardinals in 2000.

Professional career
Rusununguko was a member of the Indiana Firebirds of the AFL from 2001 to 2003. He signed with the AFL's Colorado Crush on November 17, 2003. He was traded to the Las Vegas Gladiators on January 20, 2005 Rusununguko was signed by the New Orleans VooDoo of the AFL on January 27, 2005. He signed with the AFL's New York Dragons on October 17, 2005. He was released by the Dragons on January 10, 2006. Rusununguko was listed as a Fullback/Linebacker while playing in the AFL. He played for the RiverCity Rage of the Indoor Football League in 2009.

Shooting
Rusununguko, working as a security guard, was involved in a shooting following a disturbance at an Indianapolis, Indiana bar on January 1, 2008, that left security guard Ronnie Croom dead and four others injured. As of 2011, the case remained unsolved and Rusununguko was arraigned on a gun charge.

References

External links
Just Sports Stats
Sunungura Rusununguko trading card

Living people
1978 births
American football defensive tackles
African-American players of American football
Ball State Cardinals football players
Indiana Firebirds players
Colorado Crush players
Las Vegas Gladiators players
New Orleans VooDoo players
New York Dragons players
RiverCity Rage players
Players of American football from Indianapolis
21st-century African-American sportspeople
20th-century African-American sportspeople